, sometimes credited as Nao Ohmori or Nao Omori, is a Japanese actor. He was given the Best Supporting Actor award at the 2004 Yokohama Film Festival.

Career
Omori starred in Takashi Miike's Ichi the Killer. He co-starred with Shinobu Terajima in Ryuichi Hiroki's Vibrator.

Personal life
Omori is the son of the actor Akaji Maro and the younger brother of the film director Tatsushi Ōmori.

Filmography

Films
 The Revenge: A Scar That Never Fades (1997)
 Tenshi ni Misuterareta Yoru (1999) - Shop assistant
 Big Show! Hawaii ni Utaeba (1999) - Jimmy
 Monday (2000)
 Swing Man (2000)
 Quartet (2001) - Daisuke
 Ichi the Killer (2001) - Ichi
 Harmful Insect (2001) - Man at Love Hotel
 Out (2002) - Kenji Yamamoto
 Dolls (2002) - Matsumoto's Colleague
 Demonlover (2002)  - Shoji
 Pakodate-jin (2002)
 Perfect Blue (2002) - Toshihiko Horibe
 Saru (2003) - Isomura
 Akame 48 Waterfalls (2003)
 Vibrator  (2003)  - Takatoshi
 Hyaku Iro Megane (2003) - Man Investigating Kaede
 1-Ichi (2003) - Ichi/Shiroishi
 Iden & Tity (2003) - Toshi
 Jam Films 2 (2004) - Kuroki Iwao
 Kagen no Tsuki (2004)
 Breathe In, Breathe Out (2004) - Yutaka Tadokoro
 Socrates in Love (2004)
 Nonki-na Nesan (2004) - Kazuo
 Yaji and Kita: The Midnight Pilgrims (2005) - Tortured Samurai
 It's Only Talk (2005)
 Yokubo (2005) - Goro Nose
 Rampo Noir (2005) - First Lieutenant Sunaga (story "Imomushi")
 A Day Beyond the Horizon (2005)
 The Whispering of the Gods (2005) - Ukawa
 Kagi ga Nai (2005)
 Su-ki-da (2005)
 I Just Didn't Do It (2006) - Koji Yamada
 Children (2006) - Tatsuya Jinnai
 Catch Ball Ya (2006) - Takashi Oyama
 Tekkonkinkreet (2006) (voice) - Chocola
 Tears for You (2006) - Doctor
 The Go Master (2006) - Utaro Hashimoto
 Mushishi (2006) - Koro
 Otoko wa Sore o Gaman Dekinai (2006) - Takashi
 Midnight Eagle (2007) - Kensuke Saito
 Missing (2007) - Son
 Achilles and the Tortoise (2008)
 Tokyo! (2008)
 Fish Story (2009)
 The Vulture (2009) - Masahiko Washizu
 The Laughing Policeman (2009) - Kochi Saeki
 Sweet Little Lies (2010)
 Golden Slumber (2010)
 From Up on Poppy Hill (2011) (voice) - Akio Kazama
 The Egoists (2011)
 Unfair 2: The Answer (2011)
 Tokyo Playboy Club (2012)
 Helter Skelter (2012)
 The Ravine of Goodbye (2013)
 R100 (2013)
 Parasyte: Part 1 (2014)
 Museum (2016)
 Outrage Coda (2017) - Ichikawa
 The Outsider (2018) - Seizu
 Lying to Mom (2018)
 First Love (2019)
 This Old Road: Kono Michi (2019) - Hakushū Kitahara
 Living in the  Sky (2020)
 The Great Yokai War: Guardians (2021) - Nurarihyon
 And So the Baton Is Passed (2021)
 Goodbye Cruel World (2022)
 Dr. Coto's Clinic 2022 (2022) - Takashi Sakano

Television
 Dr. Coto's Clinic (2003–06) - Takashi Sakano
 Hagetaka: Road to Rebirth (2007) - Masahiko Washizu
 Ryōmaden (2010) - Takechi Hanpeita
 Dr. Storks (2015) - Takayuki Imahashi
 Totto TV (2016) - Tadasu Iizawa
 My Housekeeper Nagisa-san (2020) - Nagisa-san
 Chimudondon (2022) - Kenzō Higa
 What Will You Do, Ieyasu? (2023) - Sakai Tadatsugu

Video Games
Yakuza 6: The Song of Life (2016) - Tsuneo Iwami

References

External links

 
 

1972 births
Living people
Japanese male film actors